Legion is the second album by American death metal band Deicide. It was released by Roadrunner Records on June 9, 1992.

Background
Legion is one of Deicide's most musically ambitious releases, incorporating more technical riffing and song structures. The band considers this album to be its most difficult, and claims it is too chaotic. When the Hoffman brothers quit the band, Eric Hoffman stated that one of the main reasons was Glen Benton refusing to play longer sets and being unable to perform the technical bass guitar riffing required for Legion'''s material. Though the album is a favourite of fans, "Dead But Dreaming" is the only song from it to remain in the band's live set (though as recently as 2010 the band has begun playing "Trifixion" and "Holy Deception" as well). Unlike Deicide's first album, no pitch shifters or harmonizers were used on Benton's vocals. However, delay, reverb, and multi-tracking were among the studio manipulations used to achieve the vocal effects on the album.

The first track, "Satan Spawn, the Caco-Daemon", features a backward message. At about twenty seconds, a voice can be heard repeating the song's title.

Steve Asheim said of Legion, "For Legion, I was too busy worrying about how we were going to get a second album out to really think about what it meant, I was just trying to stay in the music business and stay brutal."

 Reviews 

A reviewer for The Metal Storm said, "in general a good album, some songs are well executed and with complex musical writing, but there are others that are just very simple and repetitive".

Vincent Jeffries of Allmusic stated, "Legion'' stands out as a musically complex but familiar offering from the band. Live favorite 'Trifixion' is indeed one of the better cuts from the release, but it's easier to consider this disc (and most records like it) as a whole. Deicide's compositions and performances are solid and serious throughout". He also suggested, "newer death metal fans will do well to start off their collection with Legion".

Track listing
All songs written by Deicide (Glen Benton and Steve Asheim).

Personnel
Glen Benton – bass; vocals
Eric Hoffman – guitars
Brian Hoffman – guitars
Steve Asheim – drums
Deicide – production
Scott Burns – production, mixing

References

1992 albums
Deicide (band) albums
Roadrunner Records albums
Albums produced by Scott Burns (record producer)
Albums recorded at Morrisound Recording